Aboitiz Equity Ventures (AEV) is a Philippine holding company based in Metro Manila, with roots from Cebu City. The conglomerate operates in six major industries: Power, Banking and Financial Services, Food, Infrastructure, and Data Science and Artificial Intelligence. In 2017, the company was ranked 1793rd on the Forbes Global 2000. In 2022, AEV ventured into transforming its organization into a "Techglomerate" - a faster, stronger, and better version of a conglomerate. A techglomerate can refer to a startup tech company that has grown into a conglomerate or a legacy conglomerate that has used technology and startup culture to radically transform the way it behaves and operates. AEV is the latter of the two.

History
The company was founded on September 11, 1989, as Cebu Pan Asian Holdings; the name was changed to the current designation in 1993. The company went public on November 16, 1994.

Business Units

Power
Aboitiz Power Corporation is a holding company engaged in power distribution, generation, and retail electricity services. It owns Davao Light and Power Company in Davao City, Cotabato Light and Power Company in Cotabato City, Visayan Electric Company in Metro Cebu, the Mariveles Coal-Fired Power Plant in Mariveles, Bataan, Therma South, Inc. Coal Fired Power Plant in Davao City, and Therma Visayas, Inc. Coal Fired Power Plant in Toledo, Cebu

Banking and Financial Services
 Union Bank of the Philippines (UnionBank)
 City Savings Bank (formerly Cebu City Savings and Loan Association), savings bank of UnionBank
 PETNET

Food
The Food Group, composed of Pilmico Foods Corporation (Pilmico) and Gold Coin Management Holdings, Ltd. (Gold Coin), is the integrated agribusiness and food company of the Aboitiz Group. Pilmico is a leader in operating efficiency, manufacturing flour and wheat by-products in the Philippines. It has also been a strong player in animal feeds and swine production since establishing these businesses in the late 1990s. Meanwhile, Gold Coin is a pioneer in animal nutrition and in manufacturing scientifically-based animal feed in Asia.

With the acquisitions of Vinh Hoan Feeds in 2014 and Gold Coin in 2019, the Food Group is currently building capacities and capabilities to sustain profitability and grow its businesses both in the Philippines and in the ASEAN region.

Infrastructure
Aboitiz InfraCapital Inc. undertakes all infrastructure and infrastructure-related investments of the Aboitiz Group.
 Water 
 Apo Agua Infrastructura
 LIMA Water
 Balibago Waterworks Systems Inc.
 Economic Estates
 LIMA Estate
 MEZ2 Estate
 West Cebu Estate
 Digital Infrastructure (Unity Digital Infrastructure)
 Airports
 Bicol International Airport
 Bohol–Panglao International Airport
 Laguindingan Airport
 Mactan–Cebu International Airport
 The Republic Cement Group (with CRH plc), founded in 1955, produces about 7 million tons of cement annually. It is the second largest producer in the Philippines and produces about a quarter of the country's cement. In 2017, AEV announced it would invest $300 million in the subsidiary to increase capacity.

Land
AboitizLand, Inc. (AboitizLand) is the real estate arm of Aboitiz Group, engaging in the design and development of distinct communities for residential use.
 LIMA Technology Park
 Mactan Economic Zone II
 West Cebu Industrial Park

Data Science and Artificial Intelligence
Aboitiz Data Innovation is the Data Science and Artificial Intelligence arm of the Aboitiz Group.

References

Companies based in Cebu City
Financial services companies established in 1989
Holding companies of the Philippines
Companies listed on the Philippine Stock Exchange
Conglomerate companies of the Philippines
Financial services companies of the Philippines